Stuart Grant Law  (born 18 October 1968) is an Australian-born cricket coach and former cricketer.

He played one Test and 54 One Day Internationals (ODIs) for Australia. Law also captained Queensland to five Sheffield Shield titles and two one day trophies, making him the most successful captain in Australian domestic cricket; he is also Queensland's all-time leading run scorer in first-class cricket.

He is also a cricket coach,who has coached Sri Lanka, Bangladesh (2011–2012), West Indies (2018-2019) and Middlesex (2019–2021).

Domestic career

After a couple of seasons with the Australian youth team, Law made his first-class debut for Queensland in the 1988/89 Sheffield Shield, scoring 179 in his second match. In 1990/91 he had a superb season, with a batting average over 75 and scoring more than 1,200 runs.

In 1996, Law made his English County Championship debut, with Essex, and such was his success in England that he averaged over 55 in all but one of his six seasons at the county, making his career-best score of 263 in 1999. However, disagreements within the club led him to leave for Lancashire for 2002.

During his first season with Lancashire, Law was awarded his county cap. Apart from an enforced absence through injury for part of the 2004 season, Law continued to pile up the runs for his new team, scoring 1,820 in 2003 at an exceptional average of 91, and after hitting 1,277 championship runs in 2007, signed a new one-year deal with the club. Following Mark Chilton's resignation as captain at the end of the 2007 season, Law was appointed Lancashire captain ahead of players such as Dominic Cork, Glen Chapple and Luke Sutton. He was released in October 2008 to be replaced by Glen Chapple as captain for the 2009 season, before signing a contract to play for Derbyshire in limited overs cricket in 2009.

Law has represented the Chennai Superstars in the Indian Cricket League as their captain.

International career
Law made his debut for Australia in a one day international in 1994, and captained Young Australia in England the following summer. In total, Law played 54 one day matches for Australia between 1994 and 1999, including the 1996 World Cup. He batted mainly in the middle order, and took 12 wickets with a mix of medium pace and leg spin bowling.

In December 1995, he played his only Test match, the opening match of a home series against Sri Lanka. Playing in place of the injured Steve Waugh, Law scored 54 not out. Law was dropped when Waugh returned for the following match.

Honours
Law was selected as one of the five Wisden Cricketers of the Year in 1998. In 2007, he was awarded the Medal of the Order of Australia.

Coaching career

Law was appointed as Sri Lanka's assistant coach in October 2009. He was then head coach in 2011–2012 of Bangladesh Cricket when Trevor Bayliss left shortly after the 2011 world cup. The Pakistan Cricket Team was trying to make him their coach but Mickey Arthur was announced the head coach instead. On 27 January 2017, Stuart Law was appointed as the head coach of West Indies Cricket team on a two-year contract, starting on 15 February 2018  .

He coached Middlesex (2019–2021).

In February 2022, Law was named interim head coach of Afghanistan. In June 2022 he was appointed head coach of the Bangladesh national under-19 cricket team.
He is currently the head coach of Bangladesh U-19 Cricket team

See also
One Test Wonder

References

External links
 

 

1968 births
Living people
Australia One Day International cricketers
Australia Test cricketers
Australian expatriate sportspeople in England
Australian cricketers
Australian cricket coaches
Big Bash League coaches
Cricketers from Brisbane
Cricketers at the 1996 Cricket World Cup
Chennai Superstars cricketers
Coaches of the Bangladesh national cricket team
Derbyshire cricketers
Essex cricketers
ICL World XI cricketers
Lancashire cricket captains
Lancashire cricketers
Marylebone Cricket Club cricketers
Middlesex cricket coaches
People educated at Brisbane State High School
Queensland cricket captains
Queensland cricketers
Recipients of the Medal of the Order of Australia
Wisden Cricketers of the Year
Coaches of the West Indies cricket team